= Heinz Neudecker =

Founding father Matrix differential calculus

Heinz Neudecker (October 3, 1933 – December 5, 2017) was an Austrian-Dutch econometrician and statistician, recognised as a pioneering figure and a ‘founding father’ of matrix differential calculus.

== Biography ==
Heinz Neudecker was born on 3 October 1933, in The Hague, in the Netherlands. In 1961, Heinz married Erica Engels, and they had three children: Ilia, Hannah, and Franz. Heinz Neudecker passed away in Haarlem on 5 December 2017, at the age of 84.

== Education and Professional career ==
- 1959 Degree in Economics (drs., equivalent to a master’s degree), Economische Hogeschool in Rotterdam (later renamed Erasmus University).
- 1959–1964: Researcher at Landbouw-Economisch Instituut, The Hague, Netherlands
- 1964–1969: Lector/Senior Lecturer, University of Birmingham, UK
- 1967: Ph.D., University of Birmingham, UK; Dissertation: Matrix Methods for Econometric Research
- 1969–1971: Visiting Professor of Economics, Middle East Technical University (Orta Doğu Teknik Üniversitesi), Ankara, Turkey
- 1971–1972: Professor of Econometrics, Vrije Universiteit Brussel, Belgium (later continued as a special part-time professorship)
- 1972–1998: Professor of Econometrics, University of Amsterdam
- 1979 (September 1) – 1980 (July 31): Fellow at the Netherlands Institute for Advanced Study in the Humanities and Social Sciences (NIAS), where he conducted research on matrix differential calculus, (0,1) matrices, and variance matrix estimation in normal regression.

Heinz’s final speech upon retirement from the University of Amsterdam was titled Afscheid van dierenboerderij (Goodbye to the Animal Farm), which was published in a limited paper edition by UvA in 1998. As a professor emeritus, Heinz remained actively engaged in the international fields of statistics and matrix differential calculus. He continued to supervise young academics, publish papers in leading journals, and speak at conferences around the world until 2015.

In 2000, several of his international colleagues honoured his contributions to multivariate statistical analysis with a commemorative publication: Innovations in Multivariate Statistical Analysis: A Festschrift for Heinz Neudecker (edited by R. D. H. Heijmans, D. S. G. Pollock, and A. Satorra).

The book Matrix Differential Calculus with Applications in Statistics and Econometrics, co-authored by Heinz Neudecker and Jan Magnus, has been published in three editions (Wiley, 1988, 1999, 2019). It remains an essential reference for scholars and students worldwide. The book is widely recognised for its rigorous treatment of matrix calculus and its applications in econometrics and statistics, shaping the fields and advancing research in multivariate analysis.

== Pioneer of matrix differential calculus ==
Carles M. Cuadras, in his In memoriam, states the following: 'With more than 139 publications indexed in the ISI web of knowledge, Neudecker reshaped the field of matrix algebra for econometrics and multivariate analysis. He is the author (with one of his Ph.D. students, Jan Magnus) of the most influential book in the area, Matrix Differential Calculus with Applications in Statistics and Econometrics, with first edition in 1988 and a revised edition in 1991. The second edition was published in 1999.'

Further, Heinz Neudecker's pioneering role and continuing influence in matrix differential calculus is borne out by the following facts:

His doctoral dissertation, Matrix methods for economic research (1967), is still accessed on the internet.

In the field of matrix differential calculus, Heinz Neudecker is considered by many scholars as its founding father, as stated in Liu et al. 2024. This can also be inferred from the many citations of his work:The second edition of Matrix Differential Calculus has been quoted 6327 times; Neudecker, H. (1969), Some Theorems on Matrix Differentiation with Special Reference to Kronecker Matrix Products, Journal of the American Statistical Association, 64(327), 953–963, was quoted 193 times, most recently in Mahdi, E., & Fisher, T. J. (2022). Bootstrapping a powerful mixed portmanteau test for time series. Journal of Applied Statistics, 51(2), 230–255.

A very personal reference to Neudecker’s influence can be found in the introduction Götz Trenkler wrote in one of his papers: ‘A few years ago, Heinz Neudecker sent me a complimentary copy of his paper entitled Mathematical properties of the variance of the multinomial distribution. On the first page was the handwritten message: “Lieber Herr Trenkler, vielleicht interessiert Sie diese Arbeit! Ihr HN.” In fact, I found this paper, Neudecker (1995), so impressive that it motivated me to work on the same topic, namely the covariance of the multinomial distribution and related matrix theory. Of course, the reader will recognise the use of some of Neudecker’s favourite tools and tricks in the results below.’

· Neudecker’s work is also applied in several scientific disciplines that employ statistical analysis, like biometrics, sustainability sciences and geophysics.

== Politics ==
Heinz had a lifelong commitment to improving society through political activism. During his university studies in Rotterdam, he was a member of the Democratic Socialist student society Politeia, one of a 'gang of four' econometrics students pushing the organisation to a more radical course. According to his lifelong friend, Arie van der Zwan, 'Heinz was the most intellectual of the three of us’, the third person mentioned being Henk Lange. An article on the group in the periodical HP in 1984, refers to Heinz Neudecker as "a somewhat thoughtful 'ideologist' in the background".. Heinz was also a member of the linked to the Social Democratic Party's youth organisation Nieuwe Koers, where he met Erica, his future wife. In the early 1960s, he published analyses on political subjects in Maatstaf and Gard Sivik and campaigned for human rights in countries like Algeria, Vietnam, and Turkey Having become disenchanted with Social Democracy, Heinz became involved in the Green Movement in the early 1970s. He started a local Green party in his town of Schagen and served as a member of the municipal council for several years.

== Contributor and editor to Gard Sivik and Maatstaf, 1960s ==
Heinz Neudecker was one of the main contributors of Gard Sivik, an experimental Flemish-Dutch journal, and also published articles for it in the early 60s. Between 1963 and 1966, he contributed to Maatstaf, a literary and political journal, where he wrote about significant contemporary issues such as the Cold War, the Vietnam War, and his visit to Russia. His involvement in these discussions reflected his broader interest in global political dynamics during a time of great tension. Additionally, from 1965 to 1966, Heinz served as a guest editor for Maatstaf, further showcasing his engagement with both literary and political discourse.

== Published academic works ==
Heinz Neudecker published over a hundred academic publications, the first of which was a paper with his supervisor, professor Henri Theil, at Economische Hogeschool Rotterdam. Many publications would follow, often co-authored, with Heinz preferring the alphabetical order of authors. He also published papers with his students, several of whom went on to academic positions in the same field. His final publication was co-authored with A. Satorra in 2015.
